Trapezites lutea, the rare white spot skipper, is a butterfly of the family Hesperiidae. It is found in Australia in the states of New South Wales, Victoria, South Australia and Tasmania.

The wingspan is about 30 mm.

The larvae feed on Lomandra confertifolia, Lomandra densiflora, Lomandra filiformis, Lomandra longifolia and Lomandra multiflora.

Subspecies
Trapezites lutea lutea (On the slopes of the mountains of New South Wales, Victoria, South Australia)
Trapezites lutea glaucus (Tasmania)

External links
 Australian Caterpillars

Trapezitinae
Butterflies described in 1882
Butterflies of Australia